Cruzeiro Esporte Clube, commonly referred to as Cruzeiro de Rondônia, or simply Cruzeiro-RO, was a Brazilian professional football club based in Porto Velho, Rondônia. Their activities are currently closed due to financial difficulties. Cruzeiro-RO has last played in a professional match in May 2010.

They competed in the Copa Norte once.

History
The club was founded on 1 May 1963. They competed in the Copa Norte in 1999, finishing as the runner-up of the cup after being defeated in the final by Sampaio Corrêa of Maranhão state.

Stadium

Cruzeiro Esporte Clube played their home games at Estádio Aluízio Ferreira. The stadium has a maximum capacity of 7,000 people.

Achievements
Campeonato Rondoniense
2x runners-up: 1996, 1998
Copa Norte
1x finalists: 1999

Notes

References 

Defunct football clubs in Rondônia
Association football clubs established in 1963
Association football clubs disestablished in 2018
1963 establishments in Brazil
2018 disestablishments in Brazil